The Amethyst Ring by Scott O'Dell is the third  novel in the historical fiction trilogy started by The Captive and Feathered Serpent.

Plot summary
Julián Estaban, who is impersonating the Mayan god Kukulcán, fights and escapes from a powerful gold hungry conquistador, Hernán Cortés. Kukulcán's followers captured Rodrigo Perdoza, a bishop carrying a message to Cortés to detain Julián. Julián wants to be a priest and asks the bishop many times to make him one, but in the end he lets the Mayan priest sacrifice him, and Julián takes the bishop's amethyst ring. Cortés attacks and captures Kukulcán's city, the City of the Seven Serpents, but Julián escapes to a friendly large village and helps them harvest and trade pearls. He then goes to a smaller trading town and partners with Tzom Zambac and they have a successful feathered cloak business. Fearing betrayal from Tzom, he leaves and eventually finds Francisco Pizarro, a conquistador who is taking a band of Spaniards to get gold from the Inca. They capture the Incan king Atahualpa, who has a room filled with gold to pay his ransom. The Spaniards try and kill him anyway. Julián leaves the group because of his disagreements with the trial. He searches for Chima, a daughter of Atahualpa, whom he has fallen in love with. He finds her and she rejects him because he is a Spaniard. Julián then uses all of his gold to sail back to Seville. There he meets Cantú the Dwarf, who is now very wealthy from gold. Cantú gives Julián a lot of gold, but he joins the Brothers of the Poor and gives it all to them. 

Historical novels
1983 novels
Houghton Mifflin books